All Gas and Gaiters is a British television ecclesiastical sitcom which aired on BBC1 from 1966 to 1971. It was written by Pauline Devaney and Edwin Apps, a husband-and-wife team who used the pseudonym of John Wraith when writing the pilot. All Gas and Gaiters was also broadcast on BBC Radio from 1971 to 1972.

Cast
William MervynThe Rt Revd Dr Cuthbert Hever, DD, Bishop of St Ogg's
Robertson HareThe Ven Henry Blunt, the archdeacon
Derek NimmoThe Revd Mervyn Noote, the Bishop's chaplain
John BarronThe Very Revd Lionel Pugh-Critchley, Dean of St Ogg's (pilot, series 1, 4 and 5)
Ernest ClarkThe Very Revd Lionel Pugh-Critchley, Dean of St Ogg's (series 2 and 3, 1968 special)
Ruth KettlewellMrs Grace Pugh-Critchley, the Dean's wife (series 1-3, 1968 special)
Joan SandersonMrs Grace Pugh-Critchley, the Dean's wife (series 4-5)

Plot
All Gas and Gaiters, predominantly farcical in nature, was set in the close of the fictional St Ogg's Cathedral and concerned intrigues and rivalries among the clergy in the Church of England. The bishop was easygoing; his friend the archdeacon was elderly, tippling, and still appreciative of attractive women; and the bishop's chaplain was naïve and accident-prone. Their wish to live a quiet bachelor life was continually threatened by the overbearing dean, who tried to bring by-the-book rule to the cathedral.

The title is a pun, deriving from a comic expression ("all is gas and gaiters", meaning "all is well") uttered by an eccentric old gentleman clad in small-clothes and grey worsted stockings in Charles Dickens' 1839 novel Nicholas Nickleby, and later used by such writers as P. G. Wodehouse, Agatha Christie, and Powell and Pressburger (spoken in the film The Life and Death of Colonel Blimp). The phrase "all gas and gaiters" has had different meanings. Sometimes it has been used to mean "a satisfactory state of affairs" and sometimes it has had the meaning of "nonsense". The relevance of this phrase to Anglican clergy is that gaiters (worn over shoes) were part of the traditional dress of bishops and archdeacons.

The series initially aroused some controversy because of its portrayal of senior clergy as bungling incompetents, although some clergy enjoyed it. In the opening credits, St Albans Cathedral was shown as the fictional St Ogg's (but with the Crooked Spire of Church of St Mary and All Saints, Chesterfield added to the central tower). The background to the opening credits was the headmaster's garden of St. Albans School. The name "St. Ogg's" may have been taken from a fictional village in George Eliot's novel The Mill on the Floss.

It proved to be the first of a series of comedies starring Derek Nimmo in similar bumbling clerical roles(Oh, Brother!, Oh, Father! and Hell's Bells)but is regarded as the best, partly because of a strong supporting cast (particularly the experienced farceur Robertson Hare as the archdeacon) and partly because it included some elements of gentle satire.

Episodes 
The pilot and first two series were videotaped in black-and-white. The third series was videotaped in colour, but was originally broadcast in monochrome. The fourth and fifth series were made and shown in colour.

Comedy Playhouse Pilot
The pilot episode was chosen to be the opening episode of the fifth series of Comedy Playhouse, the BBC's long-running comedy strand that showcased one-off potential sitcom pilots. The pilot episode received favourable reviews from the press and gained more viewers than all the episodes in the preceding series of the show. The BBC quickly commissioned Devaney and Apps to write six more episodes, which were taped in the studio later that year. Previously thought missing from the archives, the pilot was recovered in 2001 and received its first public screening at the BFI's annual Missing Believed Wiped event at the National Film Theatre on 20 October 2001.

Series 1 (1967)
Initially only one episode The Bishop Gets the Sack was thought to have survived from this series. However in 2001, two episodes were returned to the BBC archive following their Treasure Hunt campaign; when the series' creators Pauline Devaney and Edwin Apps returned film copies of the following episodes The Bishop Rides Again and The Bishop Sees a Ghost, since they personally requested copies of two episodes from BBC at the time, when they were trying to sell the series to the US.

Series 2 (1967)
The role of The Dean was recast in this series with Ernest Clark, who would go on to play the character for the next two series. Due to the BBC's wiping policy at the time, no episodes featuring Clark are known to have survived.

Short Insert: Christmas Night With The Stars (1968)
Christmas Night with the Stars was a programme screened annually on Christmas night, when the top stars of the BBC appeared in short versions of their programmes, typically five to ten minutes long. All Gas and Gaiters appeared in a cross-over sketch with the sitcom Oh, Brother!  where Nimmo also played Father Dominic. In this sketch, Nimmo plays both roles as Noote and Dominic respectively. This sketch no longer exists in the BBC's film and videotape archives.

Series 3 (1969)
From the series onwards, the show was taped in colour. Although this series was originally transmitted in black and white, as BBC1 was still transmitting in monochrome at the time. Colour transmissions began later that year, commencing on 15 November 1969.

Series 4 (1970)
The first series to be transmitted in colour, even though it had been produced in colour since Series 3. There were cast changes to the principal roles in this series, John Barron reprised his role as The Dean  and the role of his wife Mrs Grace Pugh-Critichley was recast with Joan Sanderson, who would go on to play the character for the remainder of the series' run.

Series 5 (1971)
The final series, was also the only series with all the episodes to exist in their entirety. Although the master copies of the original 2" colour VT's for the first two episodes of this series are currently missing and only 16mm black and white film recordings are known to have survived.

Radio
A radio version of All Gas and Gaiters was broadcast on BBC Radio 4 from 5 January 1971 to 4 December 1972 for 33 episodes. The radio show used the same cast as the television series with the exception of Derek Nimmo, who left after the first series and was succeeded by Jonathan Cecil. Although seven radio episodes were thought to have been wiped, these were later found and all are available through radio enthusiasts. Some episodes were rebroadcast on BBC 7 in October and November 2006, and again a year later and in early 2009. They continued to be broadcast on the station, now renamed BBC Radio 4 Extra, in August 2011 and again in early 2017 and 2022.

Radio Episodes

Series 1 (1971)

Series 2 (1972)

Archive Status 
Only 11 episodes still exist in the archive, the others were wiped as was the standard policy of the BBC in this era. Film recordings exist for the pilot and two episodes from series 1, and two of the colour episodes from series 5 are preserved as black and white 16mm film recordings only. Only six colour episodes are preserved in their original colour videotape format.

Eight scripts of the lost episodes were published in 2015: "Only Three Can Play", "The Dean Goes Primitive", "The Bishop Goes To Town", "The Bishop Learns the Facts", "The Bishop is Hospitable", "The Bishop Takes a Holiday", "The Affair at Cookham Lock" and "The Bishop Gives a Shove".

Home Media 
All 11 surviving episodes were originally released on VHS and DVD by DD Home Entertainment on 3 November 2003, originally accompanied by a detailed behind-the-scenes booklet, written by Andy Priestner in consultation with the show's writers, Edwin Apps and Pauline Devaney, but later released without. Simply Media later gained the rights to the distribution of the series, and it re-released on 24 August 2009.

Influence and legacy
In April 2016, the radio drama based on the story behind the making of the series, All Mouth and Trousers by Mark Burgess, was aired by BBC Radio 4. The production featured John Sessions as Frank Muir, Nicholas Boulton as Stuart Allen, Gareth Williams as William Mervyn, Trevor Littledale as Robertson Hare, Zeb Soanes as Derek Nimmo and David Collings as John Barron.

References

External links
 
 
 
 All Gas and Gaiters at lostshows.com
 All Gas and Gaiters at British TV Comedy
 All Gas and Gaiters at Nostalgia Central
 

1960s British sitcoms
1966 British television series debuts
1970s British sitcoms
1971 British television series endings
1971 radio programme debuts
1972 radio programme endings
BBC Radio comedy programmes
BBC television sitcoms
Black-and-white British television shows
Comedy Playhouse
English-language television shows
Lost BBC episodes
Religious comedy television series